Mertensophryne lonnbergi (common name: Lönnbergs toad or Lonnbergs toad) is a species of toad in the family Bufonidae. It is endemic to Kenya and known from the highlands on both sides of the Great Rift Valley as well as from Mount Kenya.
Its natural habitats are montane grasslands, moorlands, and forest patches; it can survive also on agricultural land. Breeding takes place in small and shallow permanent or semi-permanent pools. It is a reasonably common species, but habitat modification could still be a threat.

References

lonnbergi
Endemic fauna of Kenya
Amphibians of Kenya
Amphibians described in 1911
Taxonomy articles created by Polbot